Oupoyo is a town in southwestern Ivory Coast. It is a sub-prefecture of Méagui Department in Nawa Region, Bas-Sassandra District.

The far western portion of the sub-prefecture is located in Taï National Park.

Oupoyo was a commune until March 2012, when it became one of 1126 communes nationwide that were abolished.

In 2021, the population of the sub-prefecture of Oupoyo was 61,973.

Villages
The fifteen villages of the sub-prefecture of Oupoyo and their population in 2014 are:

References

Sub-prefectures of Nawa Region
Former communes of Ivory Coast